Mike Nish (December 10, 1959 – December 14, 2022) was an American racing driver who competed in the CART Championship Car series and competed in world land speed record events.

Nish competed in four CART races, one in 1984 at Phoenix International Raceway and 3 more in 1986 where he recorded his best finish of 10th place at Portland International Raceway. He  qualified for the Indianapolis 500 in 1985 and 1986.
At Speed Week in August 2007, Nish captured the SCTA AA/FS (Unlimited Fuel Streamliner) record with a speed of 377.715 mph (607.8732 km/h).  He was also awarded the Hot Rod Trophy for achieving the top speed of the meet on the Bonneville Salt Flats.

On October 8, 2007, Nish attempted to break the world land speed record for carbureted vehicles set in 1965, but his engine failed after 30 seconds. Mike Nish, as well as his father Terry and brothers Jeff and T. J. have successfully broken 14 different world land speed records over the years.

On September 23, 2010, Nish broke the world land speed record for the FIA Category A, Group 2, Class 9, 1 Kilometer, [Flying Start] and Category A, Group 2, Class 9, 1 mile, Flying Start class with a speed of 285.359 mph (459.242 km/h) for the Kilometer and 285.305 mph (459.155 km/h) in the mile.

American open–wheel racing results

(key)

PPG Indycar Series

(key) (Races in bold indicate pole position)

 ''1 Replaced by Johnny Parsons

Indianapolis 500

References

1959 births
2022 deaths
American racing drivers
Champ Car drivers
Bonneville 300 MPH Club members

A. J. Foyt Enterprises drivers